Nallagatla Swamy Das (born 4 October 1963) is an Indian politician from a regional party called Telugu Desam Party in the south Indian state of Andhra Pradesh. He was twice elected as Member of Legislative Assembly in Andhra Pradesh during the years 1994-2004 from the Constituency of Tiruvuru, Krishna District.

Early life and education

Swamy Das was born in Anumullanka Village of Tiruvuru Taluk, Krishna District. His father N. Bhushanam and mother N. Leela Bayamma were both teachers. He was the third eldest of four sons to his parents, and also had one sister.
Swamy Das attended the Panchayathi Samithi elementary school.  He attended the Zilla Parishath Government High School, Nuzvid until class 9.  He did matriculation in ZPHS, Ramannapalem. He studied Intermediate at Govt. Junior College, Banigallapadu. He completed his B.A. (Economics) in 1978 from S.R. & B.G.N.R. Govt. Degree College, Khammam after which he enrolled in the M.A. (Political Science and Governance) course at the Osmania University, Hyderabad. He later completed a Masters of Education from Govt. College of Education, Nagarjuna Sagar. He did not complete his M.Phil. (Public Administration) and instead got involved into active politics from Osmania University.

Sports

Since his schooling, Nallagatla played Kabaddi. He was a well known National Kabaddi Champion playing for Nizam Kabaddi Team from Hyderabad. After injuring his leg in a game, he refrained from continuing to pursue the game.

Early political career

Swamy Das entered politics as a Student leader when he was a student at S.R. & B.G.N.R. Govt. Degree College. He was again elected as a Student Union leader for TNSF while studying at Osmania. At first he supported the Communist Party Of India[CPI/CPM]. In 1993 he entered the Telugu Desam Party. He won two elections against Koneru Rangarao, the reigning M.L.A. of Tiruvuru who was also The Deputy Chief minister of Andhra Pradesh at that time.

Legislative career 1994–2014
Swamy Das was TDP's contesting candidate five times in a row from Tiruvuru Constituency. He supported sub-categorisation of reservation for Schedule Castes. Das won "The Best All-rounder" Award from the legislature for his active participation and performance in sports, Public Speaking, Literature knowledge and other various art forms, 1999 - 2004.

In 2014, Swamy Das contested general elections representing the Telugu Desam Party, but lost in a close vote to Kokkiligadda Rakshana Nidhi.

Personal life

Swamy Das met his life partner, N. Sudha Rani when he was attending Osmania University where she was studying M.Sc.(Chemistry). They married in 1990 and the couple have one son. Rani resigned her Group one post and joined her husband in politics and was elected as Zilla Parishath Chairperson for Krishna District from Nandigama during the years 2004-2008. In 2013 she is the Telugu Desam Party women's wing Secretary for the State.

References

External links
http://myneta.info/ap09/candidate.php?candidate_id=3162
http://eci.nic.in/AE2004_Affidavits/Andhra%20Pradesh/81/NALLAGATLASWAMYDAS/NALLAGATLASWAMYDAS.HTML
http://andhra.yestopolitics.com/people?searchValue=SWAMY%20DAS%20NALLAGATLA
https://www.facebook.com/Swamydas

1963 births
Living people